The Riley MkXI, and its evolutions and deriatives, the Riley MkXX, the Riley MkXXII, and the Riley MkXXVI, are a series of Daytona Prototype race cars, designed, developed and built by Riley Technologies, between 2003 and 2016. Between 2003 and 2016, the cars scored a combined total of 84 race wins, achieved 106 podium finishes, and clinched 85 pole positions.

References

2000s cars
2010s cars
Mid-engined cars
Rear-wheel-drive vehicles
Sports prototypes